This article lists the lord ruler of Lan Na from the foundation of the Ngoenyang in 638 until the end of Kingdom of Chiang Mai under Siamese administration in 1939.

Kings of Ngoen Yang

 Lawachangkarat or Lavachankaraja or Lao Chong
 Lao Kao Kaeo Ma Mueang
 Lao Sao
 Lao Tang or Lao Phang
 Lao Klom or Lao Luang
 Lao Leo
 Lao Kap
 Lao Khim or Lao Kin
 Lao Khiang (The royal court moved to Ngeon Yang)
 Lao Khiu
 Lao Thoeng or Lao Ting
 Lao Tueng or Lao Toeng
 Lao Khon
 Lao Som
 Lao Kuak or Lao Phuak
 Lao Kiu or Lao Kwin
 Lao Chong
 Chom Pha Rueang
 Lao Choeng or Phanya Coeng or Khun Chuang
 Lao Ngoen Rueang
 Lao Sin or Lao Chuen
 Lao Ming
 Lao Mueang or Lao Moeng
 Lao Meng
 Mangrai the Great, 1261–1292 (The first king of Mangrai dynasty in Chiang Mai)

Lanna Kingdom : Mangrai dynasty 1292–1558

 Mangrai the Great, 1292–1311
 Chaiyasongkhram, 1311–1325
 Saenphu, 1325–1334
 Khamfu, 1334–1336
 Phayu, 1336–1355
 Kue Na, 1355–1385
 Saenmueangma, 1385–1401
 Samfangkaen, 1402–1441
 Tilokkarat, 1441–1487
 Yotchiangrai, 1487–1495
 Kaeo or Mueangkaeo, 1495–1525
 Ket or Muangketklao, 1525–1538 (1st reign)
 Saikham, 1538–1543
 Ket or Mueangketklao, 1543–1545 (2nd reign)
 Chiraprapha, 1545–1546 (queen's reign)
 Chaiyachettha, 1546–1547, also king of Lan Xang
 interregnum, 1547–1551
 Mekuti, 1551–1558

Lanna Kingdom: Burmese rule 1558–1775

 Mekuti, 1558–1564 (Mangrai line)
 Wisutthithewi, 1565–1578 (Mangrai line)
 Nawrahta Minsaw, 1579–1607/08
 Thado Minsaw (Phra Choi), 1607/08–1608/09
 Minye Deibba (Phra Chaiyathip), 1608/09–1614
 Thado Kyaw, 1614
 King Si Songmueang, 1615–1631
 Lord Thipphanet, 1631–1655
 Phra Saenmueang, 1655-1659
 Ruler of Phrae, 1659-1672
 Viceroy Uengsae of Ava, 1672-1675
 Che Putarai, 1675-1707
 Mang Raenra, 1707-1727
 Thepsing, 1727 (independent ruler)
 Ong Kham, 1727-1759 
 Ong Chan, 1759-1761 (independent ruler)
 Khihut, 1761-1763 (independent ruler)
 Po Aphaikhamini, 1763-1768 
 Po Mayu-nguan, 1768-1775

Lanna states under Siamese tributary 1775–1899

Thonburi Royal Court

Ruler of Chiangmai 
 Phraya Chaban (Bunma) 1775–1782

Chet Ton Dynasty 
Chet Ton Dynasty (or Thipchang Dynasty) was founded in 1732 by Thipchang, a hunter who was appointed by the King of Burma as King Ruler of Lampang.

Rulers of Chiang Mai (as head of the dynasty) 1782-1939

 King Kawila, 1782-1813 (Ex-Ruler of Lampang)
 Prince Thammalangka or Dharmalanka, 1813-1822
 Prince Khamfan, 1823-1825 (Ex-Ruler of Lamphun)
 Prince Phutthawong or Buddhavansa, 1826-1846
 King Mahotaraprathet, 1847-1854 
 King Kawirolot Suriyawong, 1856-1870
 King Inthawichayanon, 1870-1897
 Prince Intavaroros Suriyavongse, 1901-1910 (Thai annexed Lanna)
 Prince Kaew Nawarat, 1910-1939 (title dissolved)

Rulers of Lampang 1732-1925
 King Thipchang, 1732-1759 (Burmese Era)
 Prince Chaikaeo, 1759-1774 (Burmese Era)
 Prince Kawila, 1774-1782 (The first ruler under Siamese, became Ruler of Chiangmai in 1782)
 Prince Khamsom, 1782-1794
 King Duangthip, 1794-1825
 Prince Chaiwong or Jayavansa, 1825-1838
 Prince Khattiya, 1838
 Prince Noi In, 1838-1848 (Ex-Ruler of Lamphun)
 Prince Worayannarangsi or Varayanaransi, 1848-1873
 Prince Phrommaphiwong or Brahmabhivansa, 1873-1887
 Prince Suriya Changwang or Surya Changwang, 1887
 Prince Noranan Chaichawalit or Narananda Jayajavalit, 1887-1897
 Prince Bunyawat Wongmanit or Bunyavadya Vansamanit, 1897-1922 (Thai annexed Lanna)
 Prince Ratchabut (Noi Mueangphruan), 1922-1925 (title dissolved)

Rulers of Lamphun 1805-1943
 Prince Khamfan, 1805-1815 (Ruler of Chiang Mai in 1823)
 King Bunmamueang, 1815-1827
 Prince Noi In, 1827-1837 (Ruler of Lampang in 1838)
 Prince Khamtan, 1838-1841
 Prince Thammalangka or Dharmalanka, 1841-1843
 Prince Chailangkaphisan Sophakkhun, 1848-1871
 Prince Daradirekratphairot, 1871-1888
 Prince Hemphinphaichit, 1888-1895
 Prince Inthayongyotchot, 1895-1911 (Siam annexed Lanna)
 Prince Chakkham Khachonsak, 1911-1943 (title dissolved)

See also
 List of Kings of Thailand

Sources
 Collage

References

Lan Na
Former monarchies of Asia